Robert Hilton may refer to:

Robert Hilton of Swine & Winestead, MP for Yorkshire (UK Parliament constituency) in 1339
Robert Hilton (15th century MP) (died 1431), MP for Lincolnshire in 1416 and Yorkshire in 1419
Robert Benjamin Hilton (1821–1894), American lawyer and politician
Bob Hilton (born 1943), American television personality

See also
Several Robert Hyltons, of the Baron Hylton